Schønheyder is a surname. Notable people with the surname include:

Anna Schønheyder (1877–1927), Norwegian painter and textile artist
Johan Chr. Schønheyder (1915–2015), Norwegian insurance manager, orienteer and sports official
Johan Christian Schønheyder (1742–1803), Danish-Norwegian priest
Johan Franciscus Schønheyder (1879–1968), Norwegian ships engineer
Rolf Schønheyder (1913–1994), Norwegian sprinter